Samsonovskaya is a rural locality (a village) and the administrative center of Dvinitskoye Rural Settlement, Syamzhensky District, Vologda Oblast, Russia. The population was 180 as of 2002. There are 3 streets.

Geography 
Samsonovskaya is located 53 km northeast of Syamzha (the district's administrative centre) by road. Kononovskaya is the nearest rural locality.

References 

Rural localities in Syamzhensky District